The "Yes We Can" Community Center is a community center in New Cassel, in Nassau County, on Long Island, in New York, United States. It is located within and operated by the Town of North Hempstead.

Description 
The community center opened in 2012, and the opening ceremony took place on September 8 of that year. The "Yes We Can" part of the community center's name is a nod to President Barack Obama's 2008 campaign slogan. It is located at 141 Garden Street in New Cassel. The center has an NBA-sized basketball court, an exercise room, and party rooms, as well as classrooms and activity rooms and community spaces, and programs for children. The rental of space at the center is also available.

The community center also serves as the practice facility for the Long Island Nets.

Media 
The community center houses the studios of North Hempstead TV (NHTV), which is the Town of North Hempstead's 24-hour television channel.

Awards 
The "Yes We Can" Community Center is a LEED Platinum-certified building for its environmentally-friendly design.

References 

Town of North Hempstead, New York
Parks in Nassau County, New York
Community centers in the United States